Rebecca Roberts (born 1994), is a Welsh strongwoman and grip athlete, and winner of the 2021 World's Strongest Woman competition in Daytona Beach.

Biography 
Roberts grew up in North Wales, and is Welsh by birth. Growing up, she has "not been dealt the best cards in life", after losing her mother at a young age and her father suffering from dementia shortly after, however she attended university in Liverpool where she studied forensic psychology and through university clubs she discovered rugby. 

She was introduced to strength and grip sports by her partner Paul Savage, who remains her coach. She is an advocate for body positivity and mental health, partially due to her own experience of bullying due to her weight and size. Roberts works full time but still trains roughly 20 hours a week to be able to compete at an international level. She is very active on social media, posting about her training, competitions and her weight loss journey.

Career 
Roberts' strongwoman career began with her first competition in 2016. Standing at 6' 3", she has competed in numerous strongwoman competitions since, as well as grip competitions. She also holds several world records.

References 

Strongwomen
1994 births
Living people